Oxyptilus scutifer is a species of moth in the genus Oxyptilus known from Costa Rica and Ecuador.

References

Oxyptilini
Moths described in 1930